Dai Jones (born 31 March 1941) is a Welsh footballer who played as a forward in the Football League.

References

Living people
Welsh footballers
Association football forwards
Mansfield Town F.C. players
Bath City F.C. players
Millwall F.C. players
Trowbridge Town F.C. players
Newport County A.F.C. players
English Football League players
1941 births
Footballers from Neath
Ton Pentre F.C. players